Kurdeh (also Romanized as Kūrdeh; also known as Kūrdeh-e Lār, and Kur-deh-Lâr) is a village in Dehkuyeh Rural District, in the Central District of Larestan County, Fars Province, Iran. At the 2006 census, its population was 2,927, in 698 families.

References 

Populated places in Larestan County